Aleksandrowicz or Alexandrowicz is a Polish-language surname derived from the given name Alexander. The Russian-language equivalent in Aleksandrovich.

It may refer to:

Julian Aleksandrowicz (1908-1988), Polish professor of medicine
Patryk Aleksandrowicz (born 1983), Polish footballer
Ra'anan Alexandrowicz (born 1969), Israeli film director 
Ze'ev Aleksandrowicz (1905-1992), Israeli photographer

Polish-language surnames
Patronymic surnames
Surnames from given names